The 2003 Superbike World Championship was the sixteenth FIM Superbike World Championship season. The season started on 2 March at Valencia and finished on 19 October at Magny-Cours after 12 rounds.

Rule changes for 2003 allowed 1000cc machines (either twins, triples or four-cylinder) to race. The rule changes in MotoGP which allowed 4-stroke engines starting from 2002 meant that the Japanese manufacturers had focused their resources there; as a result the Superbike World Championship was left with limited factory involvement, with Ducati, Suzuki and the new-for-2003 Carl Fogarty's Foggy Petronas as the only factory teams. As a result of most of the field being formed of Ducati motorcycles, the championship was given the derogatory label of the "Ducati Cup" in some quarters.

The factory Ducati Team entered the only two Ducati 999s in the field, taking 20 wins from 24 races in a season where all races were won by Ducati. Neil Hodgson won the riders' championship and Ducati won the manufacturers' championship.

Race calendar and results

Championship standings

Riders' standings

Manufacturers' standings

Entry list

References

Superbike World Championship seasons
World